Jane Gail (August 16, 1890 – January 30, 1963), born Ethel S. Magee in Salem, New York, was an early American silent movie and stage actress.

Biography
Gail is best remembered for her role in  the silent film Traffic in Souls (1913), and the adaptations of Dr. Jekyll and Mr. Hyde (1913), where she gained worldwide fame as Dr. Jekyll's (King Baggot) imperiled fiancée. She also appeared in the 1912 version of Jekyll and Hyde, but as an extra.

A veteran of 19 film appearances between 1912 and 1920, Gail first got her acting start on the Broadway stage, appearing in two productions, The Rack and The City. She was only 30 years old when she made her last film, Bitter Fruit (1920). She never appeared on the silver screen after that. Gail died in St. Petersburg, Florida, on January 30, 1963. She was 72 years old.

Partial filmography
Dr. Jekyll and Mr. Hyde (1912)
Twixt Love and Ambition (1912)
Dr. Jekyll and Mr. Hyde (1913)
Traffic in Souls (1913)
 Gold Is Not All (1913) as The Girl
 Called Back (1914)
 The Difficult Way (1914)
 The Black Spot (1914)
She Stoops to Conquer (1914)
 The Prisoner of Zenda (1915)
Rupert of Hentzau (1915)
20,000 Leagues Under the Sea (1916)

References

External links

Jane Gail biography at Yahoo! Movies
Silent film Actress Jane Gail bio and filmography at Fandango website

 well known portrait of Jane Gail from the silent film era
portrait of Jane Gail wearing a fur, NY Public Library Billy Rose Collection(she's mistakenly identified as Janet Gail)

1890 births
1963 deaths
American silent film actresses
People from Salem, New York
American film actresses
20th-century American actresses
People from St. Petersburg, Florida